Wiktor Michał Durlak (born 5 July 1983) is a Polish politician. He was elected to the Senate of Poland (10th term) representing the constituency of Nowy Sącz.

References 

Living people
1983 births
Place of birth missing (living people)
21st-century Polish politicians
Members of the Senate of Poland 2019–2023